Barwanah is a town in Al-Anbar province in Iraq. The town was captured by ISIL in December 2013 and was recaptured by pro-Iraqi government forces in September 2014.

References

Populated places in Al Anbar Governorate
Populated places on the Euphrates River